Rede Telecine ("[the] Telecine Network[s]") is a Brazilian premium television network owned by Canais Globo, a division of Grupo Globo, jointly with Hollywood studios Paramount Pictures, Universal Pictures, Metro-Goldwyn-Mayer, and Walt Disney Studios.

The network consists of six channels, airing primarily theatrically released motion pictures from its studio owners and other Brazilian distributors, such as Globo Filmes, Paris Filmes, Califórnia Filmes, and Europa Filmes, as well as having the premium second-run content rights to Sony Pictures and Warner Bros. Pictures (first-run rights are held by its competitor HBO, corporate sibling of Warner Bros. – both part of Warner Bros. Discovery).

The Telecine Networks

Telecine Premium
The flagship channel, one of the first four Globosat channels (as Telecine, with Multishow, GNT and TopSport – now SporTV), focused on recent film releases of many genres. Renamed Telecine 1 in 1997, with the launch of the other four channels, and several years later, was renamed once again to its current name.

Telecine Action
Originally Telecine 2, dedicated to action, adventure, thriller, horror and some adult films, also featured series such as Numb3rs. Starting in February 2011, the channel started offering dual-audio (original audio by default and dubbed in Portuguese as an option) and electronic subtitles. Later that year, the channel changed its language options to Portuguese audio and subtitles turned off by default (can be turned on by the user) and original audio with subtitles as an option.

Telecine Touch
Originally Telecine 3 and later Telecine Emotion, was dedicated to dramatic and romantic films, until it was renamed Telecine Light, when the channel started featuring some comedy films, previously featured on Telecine 4/Happy. On October 22, 2010, the channel was once again renamed to Telecine Touch, featuring films that "touch" the channel's audience. Basically, the channel reverted to Telecine 3/Emotion's format of drama and romance.

Telecine Pipoca
Originally Telecine 4 and later Telecine Happy, was dedicated to family and comedy films. Its current incarnation, Telecine Pipoca ("pipoca" is Portuguese for "popcorn"), is based on recent releases, dubbed in Portuguese.

Telecine Cult
On its original incarnation, Telecine 5 and later Telecine Classic, it was dedicated to classic film. Currently, the channel features independent, alternative and "cult" films, also running some classic films.

Telecine Fun
The sixth standard-definition Telecine network, Telecine Fun was launched on October 22, 2010, featuring comedy films, romantic comedies and animated films, previously featured on Telecine 4/Happy (now Telecine Pipoca) and Telecine Light (now Telecine Touch).

Language options
Five of the networks feature dual-audio and electronic subtitles.
Telecine Premium has original audio and Portuguese subtitles turned on by default (can be turned off by the user), with the dubbed version as an option.
Telecine Pipoca, Action, Touch and Fun have audio dubbed in Portuguese with subtitles turned off by default (can be turned on by the user), with the original audio as an option.
The exception is Telecine Cult, which only features the original audio, subtitled in Portuguese.

HD channels
In April 2009, Telecine launched its first high-definition channel, Telecine HD, featuring recent releases, and most premieres were simulcasted on Telecine Premium, but Telecine HD wasn't a full simulcast of Telecine Premium, with a different programming, instead having an all-HD lineup, with 5.1 audio.
On October 22, 2010, Telecine HD was replaced with a high-definition simulcast of Telecine Premium.
On January 31, 2010, the HD version of Telecine Pipoca was launched, following the same all-HD and simulcasted premieres model, though it became a full simulcast on October 22, 2010.
An HD simulcast of Telecine Action was launched on November 1, 2010.
HD simulcasts of Telecine Touch and Telecine Fun were launched on December 8, 2011.
With the launch of an HD simulcast of Telecine Cult on December 4, 2012, now all six Telecine networks are available in high-definition.

Video on demand services
Telecine offers two video on demand services:
Telecine On Demand: Offers pay-per-view film rentals as soon as the titles are released on home video platforms, such as DVD and Blu-ray Disc. Available for NET, SKY and GVT subscribers.
Telecine Play: Included with the Telecine subscription for NET, CLARO TV, SKY, OI TV, GVT and Vivo customers, offers most films to which Telecine has the rights, on desktop and notebook computers with Silverlight installed, iOS-based devices (iPhone, iPod Touch, iPad) and Android-based smartphones. A selection of Telecine Play films, including most recent titles, is available on the television providers' VOD services. New titles are added to Telecine Play as soon as the next day of its Telecine premiere.

References

External links
Rede Telecine website 

Television networks in Brazil
Globosat
NBCUniversal
The Walt Disney Company subsidiaries
Paramount Global subsidiaries
Metro-Goldwyn-Mayer subsidiaries
Mass media in Rio de Janeiro (city)
Former News Corporation subsidiaries
Universal Pictures subsidiaries